Monterey Colonial is an architectural style developed in Alta California (today's US state of California when under Mexican rule). Although usually categorized as a sub-style of Spanish Colonial style, the Monterey style is native to the post-colonial Mexican era of Alta California. Creators of the Monterey style were mostly recent immigrants from New England states of the US, who brought familiar vernacular building styles and methods with them to California.

The style is characterized by two stories, continuous surrounding porches on both levels, and a hip roof, often created by adding a framed upper level over existing adobe walls on the lower level. The first known example of the style is the Larkin House in Monterey, California, built by Thomas O. Larkin in 1835. The largest example of the style is the Rancho Petaluma Adobe, begun by Mariano Vallejo in Petaluma, California in 1836.

Revivals of the style have been popular in the 20th century, substituting wood framing or brick for adobe. Other common variations use gable-end roofs and second-story-only covered porches. Monterey Colonial is one of the historical styles recognized (though not encouraged for new construction) by the architectural design guidelines of Santa Barbara, California.

Examples
Larkin House, in Monterey, California, a U.S. National Historic Landmark
Mary C. W. Black Studio House, in Monterey, California, one of few residential examples of the style in Monterey
Jose Maria Alviso Adobe, in Milpitas, California
Jose Eusebio Boronda Adobe in Salinas, California, built in 1846
Castro Adobe, formerly Rancho San Andres near Watsonville, California, built in 1848-49
 Vicente Martinez Adobe, Martinez, California, built in 1849
 José Castro House in San Juan Bautista, built in 1840.

See also
 Spanish Colonial architecture

References

External links

Spanish Colonial architecture in California
Spanish Colonial Revival architecture in California
History of Monterey County, California
American architectural styles
House styles
Colonial architecture in California
Spanish Colonial Revival architecture
Architecture in California